The Leiffer House, also known as the Kidd-Fink House, was built in 1923 near Estes Park, Colorado. The house was built in a rustic style, using fire-killed timber in a unique local adaptation of the American Craftsman style more prevalent in Southern California. The land was owned from 1901 to 1917 by Enos A. Mills, the "father of Rocky Mountain National Park". Mills sold the property to May L. Kidd, who built the house. The house and its furnishings were donated to the National Park Service, which took possession in 1988.

See also
National Register of Historic Places listings in Larimer County, Colorado

References

Houses on the National Register of Historic Places in Colorado
Houses completed in 1923
Houses in Larimer County, Colorado
Rustic architecture in Colorado
National Register of Historic Places in Larimer County, Colorado
1923 establishments in Colorado